William Burgess (born 26 October 1930) is a Canadian former yacht racer who competed in the 1960 Summer Olympics. He was born in Vancouver, British Columbia.

References

1930 births
Living people
Sportspeople from Vancouver
Canadian male sailors (sport)
Olympic sailors of Canada
Sailors at the 1960 Summer Olympics – Star